Katrine Pedersen (born 5 April 1996) is a Danish karateka. She won the silver medal in the women's kumite 68 kg at the 2016 World Karate Championships in Linz, Austria. She is also a two-time bronze medalist in this event at the European Karate Championships.

Career 

At the 2017 World Games held in Wrocław, Poland, she competed in the women's kumite 68 kg event where she lost her bronze medal match against Kayo Someya of Japan.

In 2019, she competed in the women's kumite 68 kg event at the European Games held in Minsk, Belarus. She did not win a match in her group and she did not advance to the semi-finals.

In 2021, she competed at the World Olympic Qualification Tournament held in Paris, France hoping to qualify for the 2020 Summer Olympics in Tokyo, Japan.

Achievements

References

External links 
 

Living people
1996 births
Place of birth missing (living people)
Danish female karateka
Competitors at the 2017 World Games
European Games competitors for Denmark
Karateka at the 2019 European Games
20th-century Danish women
21st-century Danish women